is a tactical role-playing game for the Nintendo 64. It was released only in Japan in 1999. The game can make use of the Nintendo 64's Transfer Pak with the Game Boy Color game Super Robot Wars: Link Battler.

Series included in Super Robot Wars 64
Aura Battler Dunbine
Banpresto Originals (not a TV or movie series)
Blue Comet SPT Layzner
Chōdenji Robo Combattler V
Dancouga – Super Beast Machine God
Getter Robo
Getter Robo G
Shin Getter Robo
Giant Robo (debut)
GoShogun
Invincible Steel Man Daitarn 3
Invincible Super Man Zambot 3
Mazinger
Great Mazinger
Grendizer
Gundam
Mobile Suit Gundam: The 08th MS Team (debut)
Mobile Suit Gundam 0083: Stardust Memory
Mobile Suit Zeta Gundam
Mobile Suit Gundam ZZ
Mobile Suit Gundam: Char's Counterattack
Mobile Suit Gundam F91
Mobile Fighter G Gundam
Mobile Suit Gundam Wing
Gundam Wing: Endless Waltz
Six God Combination Godmars (debut)

Originals
The player is able to choose 4 storylines: Super Robot Male, Super Robot Female, Real Robot Male, Real Robot Female. Each has a protagonist and rival.

The original robots of this game would later be re-used and upgraded in Super Robot Wars A

Super Robot Male Route
Protagonist: Brad Skywind.
Piloting: Earthgain (predecessor of Soulgain)
Rival: Katz Folneus
Piloting: Virose (predecessor of Vysaga)
Both robots will later combine into Super Earthgain (supposedly the predecessor of Zweizergain)
Super Robot Female Route
Protagonist: Manami Hamill
Piloting: Simurgh
Rival: Aisha Ridgemond
Piloting: Elbulls
Both robots will later combine into Simurgh Splendid (predecessor of Angelg)
Real Robot Male Route
Protagonist: Arklight Blue
Piloting: Soldifar, upgraded into Ashcleef (predecessors of Ash Saver)
Rival: Elrich Schtazen
Piloting: Norouz
Real Robot Female Route
Protagonist: Selene Meneth
Piloting: Svanhild, upgraded into Rathgrith Custom (part of the Valkyrie series, predecessors of both Randgrith and Laz Angriff)
Rival: Reese Greasewell
Piloting: Sigrun

If you take a real robot hero and choose the Oz road, a bug will occur (you will not be able to play with Daitarn 3 anymore during the game).

Reception
On release, Famitsu magazine scored the game a 30 out of 40.

References

1999 video games
Banpresto games
Games with Transfer Pak support
Japan-exclusive video games
Nintendo 64 games
Nintendo 64-only games
Super Robot Wars
Tactical role-playing video games
Video games developed in Japan